Benedikt Löwe (born 1972) is a German mathematician and logician working at the
universities of Amsterdam, Hamburg, and Cambridge.
He is known for his work on mathematical logic and the foundations of mathematics, as well as for initiating the interdisciplinary conference series Foundations of the Formal Sciences (FotFS; 1999–2013) and Computability in Europe (CiE; since 2005).

Biography 

Löwe studied mathematics and philosophy at the universities of Hamburg, Tübingen, HU Berlin, and Berkeley. In 2001, he completed his PhD entitled Blackwell Determinacy about determinacy under supervision of Donald A. Martin and Ronald Björn Jensen.
He works at the Institute for Logic, Language and Computation of the University of Amsterdam since 2003 and was appointed professor for mathematical logic and interdisciplinary applications of logic at the University of Hamburg in 2009.
Currently, he is also an extraordinary fellow at Churchill College of the University of Cambridge.
Löwe is Managing Editor of the journal Mathematical Logic Quarterly. 

He is the Secretary General of the Division for Logic, Methodology and Philosophy of Science and Technology of the International Union of History and Philosophy of Science and Technology
and a member of the International Academy for Philosophy of Science.
From 2012 to 2022, he was the President of the German Association for Mathematical Logic and for Basic Research in the Exact Sciences (DVMLG).

Co-edited Volumes (a selection) 
 2006. Logical approaches to computational barriers : Second Conference on Computability in Europe, CiE 2006, Swansea, UK, June 30 – July 5, 2006; proceedings. Co-edited with Arnold Beckmann, Ulrich Berger and John V. Tucker.
 2008. Games, scales, and Suslin cardinals. Co-edited with Alexander S. Kechris and John R. Steel. Cambridge : Cambridge University 
 2008. Logic and theory of algorithms : 4th Conference on Computability in Europe, CiE 2008, Athens, Greece, June 15 – 20, 2008; proceedings. Co-edited with Arnold Beckmann and Costas Dimitracopoulos. Berlin ; Heidelberg [u.a.] : Springer
 2011. Wadge Degrees and Projective Ordinals The Cabal Seminar Volume II. Co-edited with Alexander S. Kechris and John R. Steel.

References 

1972 births
Living people
German logicians
Set theorists
Mathematical logicians
German philosophers
German male writers
21st-century German mathematicians
Fellows of Churchill College, Cambridge
Academic staff of the University of Amsterdam
Academics of the University of Cambridge
Academic staff of the University of Hamburg